Manos Limpias is a trade union registered in Spain, allegedly representing employees of the Spanish public services. The group was founded in Madrid in 1995 by Spanish lawyer Miguel Bernad Remón, a notable figure within the Spanish extreme right, who entered politics as a protege of Blas Piñar, during his tenure as the Fuerza Nueva and National Front party secretary. The group takes their name from the Mani Pulite judiciary movement in Italy, instigated by Antonio Di Pietro.

Notability
Considered by  The New York Times and several Spanish media to be politically motivated by the far-right Manos Limpias is best known for its role in the indictment of Baltasar Garzón, a judge who investigated crimes against humanity committed by the Franco regime (arguably its cause célèbre), and the persecution of alleged gay overtones in a children's TV show.

Structure
At present, the union states that it has over 6,000 members, who financially contribute an annual fee of 60 euros. It is currently under investigation for extortion from banks and the royal family.  Miguel Bernad is the only member of Manos Limpias who is publicly known. On 26 April 2016 he indicated that he wanted to dissolve the union. According to The New York Times, the union has no institutional representation as of 2009.

Social and political objectives 
Manos Limpias' self-proclaimed goal is to defend the constitutional Rule of law against corruption and separatist nationalism. Manos Limpias declares itself independent from any party, and claims to have no ideological affiliation; however, the vast majority of the lawsuits brought by them to court were consistently against the socioliberal centre-right or against the nationalist right in Catalonia and Basque Country, with some exceptions of cases against the right wing Partido Popular. The group has often been described by the media as a far-right civil servants' organisation due to their choice of court actions and Mr. Bernad's past membership of the far right party Fuerza Nueva during the early eighties.

Public nature
Section 10 of the Provincial Court of Barcelona, Spain, in its order of 23 March 2015, confirming a previous statement, it reminded Manos Limpias that the law gives the right to private prosecution to private entities, not to public entities. "The popular action can only be vetoed the entities of public nature" emphasizes the car.

The resolution concludes that Manos Limpias is an organization "quasi-public, although its constitution has a private basis", adding: "Its significance and its legal nature is public". And that "we are faced with two unequivocal conclusions: Manos Limpias is a trade union and, moreover, its activity focuses on the field of the public administration."

"Trade Unions have constitutional recognition, they receive public assistance or subsidies and dedicate themselves to participate in collective bargaining processes. Therefore, their nature can never be private".

For the audience, since the activity of the union focuses on the field of administration, Manos Limpias has no legitimacy to supplant the role attributed by the law to prosecutions that holds the adversarial principle in defense of the general good.

Manos Limpias held no accounts or assemblies that require their estatutos.

Propensity for legal action 
The Court of Barcelona argues that "it seems that the activity of this trade union is not other than to file complaints" and recalls that "it is also the duty of the courts to guarantee the right of defense and the speed of process".

The court opinion also fears that the activity of Manos Limpias can cause "accusatory hypertrophy that may affect the right of defense and to make the process even slower and create a plurality of charges while they are not offended by the crime, they can not have in criminal proceedings a different interest to the Prosecutor ".

Quarrel of the prosecution for misappropriation and laundering 
The Madrid Prosecution of Economic Crimes (Spain) investigates the president of Manos Limpias, Miguel Bernad, and attorney of the trade union Virginia Lopez Negrete for alleged crime misappropriation of funds and money laundering. The prosecution believes that Miguel Bernad and attorney Virginia Lopez may have extorted money for the union by exploiting the funds relating to the prosecution of the scams of Forum and Afinsa. the Court admitted the complaint against both.

The Spanish Commission for the Prevention of Money Laundering and Monetary Offences (SEPBLAC) conducted a comprehensive financial intelligence report and found evidence of criminal activity. For this reason, the Sepblac sent a complaint to the Economic Crimes Section of the Provincial Prosecutor of Madrid, where they opened investigative proceedings. The financial research report on the accounts of Virginia Lopez Negrete threw up surprises.

Investigated by the Supreme Court 
In February 2015 the Criminal Division of the Spanish Supreme Court opened an investigation to Manos Limpias considering that could incur an abuse of process In its resolution says that "it is not permissible that the procedural part discontented with the judgment answer, nor with the interposition of a resource, but with the presentation of the complaint orphan foundation. " The court adds that "if these reactions would be dynamited it became widespread climate of security and peace that should surround a Court to decide."

Investigations for fraud and extortion

The Spanish Economic Crime Unit and tax evasion detection service (UDEF) of the National Police has, since late 2014 been carrying an investigation against Manos Limpias and Ausbanc, A legal support service for bank clients. Manos Limpias and Ausbanc coordinated, for years, to lodge felony complaints against all types of enterprises and institutions and then to demand large sums of money in exchange for the complaint withdrawal. The investigations are led by the Spanish National Court and is focus primarily against the president of Ausbanc, Miguel Bernad and Virginia López Negrete.

There have been reports of workers and several victims of the alleged plot. One of them is one of the people who sat on the bench 'case Nóos'. Another of the facts investigated is the sudden withdrawal of a complaint filed against any of the parts "because they had already claimed extortion".

For some years, Ausbanc intimidated with open court cases, for which he teamed up with Manos Limpias. The Ausbanc President, Luis Pineda, and the Secretary General of Manos Limpias, Miguel Bernad, maintained a friendship for years and have been linked to far-right settings. Luis Pineda and Miguel Bernad "come and have militated in far-right movements "and agreed" with Virginia López (Negrete, a spokesman for Manos Limpias) in Blesa case, when Luis Pineda worked as a lawyer on behalf of Manos Limpias".

Legal actions 
Manos Limpias has achieved some legal successes such as the conviction on contempt of court charges of the president of the Basque parliament, Juan Maria Atutxa, for disobeying the Supreme Court's requirement to disband Sozialista Abertzaleak the political wing of ETA.

Manos Limpias achieved some controversial notoriety in the international press after filing a lawsuit against the Spanish investigating judge Baltasar Garzón with respect of his 2008 investigation of war crimes committed during the Spanish Civil War.  The investigation was stopped because it was deemed to contravene the 1977 amnesty law and break the principle of 'irretroactivity' of law. The Spanish Civil War took place before 1940, whereas the concept of crimes against humanity was not implemented in International Law until 1945.  However, an element of retroactivity was provided for at the time in that perpetrators of war crimes committed in the period 1939-1945 have been brought to justice, for example at the Nuremberg Trials.

Manos Limpias sought to prosecute Garzón for undertaking his investigation, and accused Garzón of breaking the 1977 amnesty law, exceeding his competences as an investigating judge of the Audiencia Nacional and deliberately acting in an unjust and unfair manner (as in 1998 Garzón dismissed a similar indictment against communist politician Santiago Carrillo, accused of crimes against humanity during the Spanish Civil War, based on the principle of irretroactivity). In May 2009 the Supreme Court accepted Manos Limpias' lawsuit against Garzón for prevarication: his "blatant, deliberate, conscious and arrogant role" in "trespassing against the dead". In 2010 Garzón was suspended as a judge pending trial. On 27 February 2012 the Spanish Supreme Court found Garzón innocent on these charges. It is worth noting that the United Nations has requested that Spain repeal the 1977 law.

In February 2012, Garzón was convicted and disqualified for 11 years on a completely different charge to the above; this decision is under appeal.

In an interview with the Spanish Catholic radio Station COPE at the time of the indictment, Miguel Bernad claimed that, by admitting the latest action against Garzón, the Supreme Court had given a boost to its mission of battling against the current "deterioration in the rule of law". There had been some twenty previous attempts from Manos Limpias to incriminate Garzón, for various alleged offences including negligence or delay in the seizure of taverns used by ETA militants, for contributing to the leading centre-left national newspaper El País, for contributing to an interview with former parliamentary president Felipe González, for participating in a rally against the war in Iraq and for leaking the medical report of Augusto Pinochet.  Other Manos Limpias complaints include promotion of gay marriage in a popular TV puppet show.

Manos Limpias is the only accusation against the Spanish princess Cristina, by lawyer Virginia Lopez Negrete, who said all citizens were equal before the law. Princess Cristina remains sixth in line to the throne.

References

External links 

Trade unions in Spain
Public sector trade unions
Far-right politics in Spain
Spanish nationalism
Trade unions established in 1995
Populism in Spain